Grigore Brişcu (1884 in Bârlad – 1965 in Bucharest) was a Romanian engineer and inventor.

Inventor of the helicopter 
1909 Brişcu was the first engineer to begin experimenting with the cyclic variation of rotor blade pitch to ensure horizontal flight and stability in helicopters. He invented a prototype "air-carriage" with all the features of a helicopter-like flying-machine: horizontal, vertical and lateral movement and fixed-point landing. It was equipped with two coaxial propellers rotating in opposite directions. This was flown experimentally by the French aviator Paul Cornu, who built a prototype with an Antoinett engine. The Brişcu rotary engine was patented by the Romanian Office for Inventions (patent no. 2323/2046 of 1912).

References 

1884 births
Aviation inventors
Aviation pioneers
People from Bârlad
Romanian aerospace engineers
Romanian inventors
1965 deaths